Autographa rubida is a moth of the family Noctuidae first described by Rodrigues Ottolengui in 1902. It is found from Newfoundland west across southern Canada to south-eastern British Columbia, south to Maine, and Minnesota.

The wingspan is about 35 mm. Adults are on wing in June depending on the location. There is a single generation per year.

The larval food plants are unknown, but larvae have been reared on Taraxacum officinale.

References

Plusiini
Moths of North America
Moths described in 1902